A facula  (plural: faculae ), Latin for "little torch", is literally a "bright spot". The term has several common technical uses. It is used in planetary nomenclature for naming certain surface features of planets and moons, and is also a type of surface phenomenon on the Sun's photosphere. In addition, a bright region in the projected field of a light source is sometimes referred to as a facula, and photographers often use the term to describe bright, typically circular features in photographs that correspond to light sources or bright reflections in a defocused image.

Solar facula

Solar faculae are bright spots in the photosphere that form in the canyons between solar granules, short-lived convection cells several thousand kilometers across that constantly form and dissipate over timescales of several minutes. Faculae are produced by concentrations of magnetic field lines. Strong concentrations of faculae appear in solar activity, with or without sunspots. The faculae and the sunspots contribute noticeably to variations in the "Solar constant".
The chromospheric counterpart of a facular region is called a plage.

Cererian facula
Cererian faculae were initially speculated to suggest current or past outgassing on Ceres, perhaps due to volcanism or cometary activity. The brightest cluster of spots (Cereale Facula) is located in the center of an  crater called Occator. These bright features have an albedo of about 40%, four times brighter than the average of Ceres's surface. The spots appear to be mostly sodium carbonate, implying that hydrothermal activity followed by evaporation of the water is probably what created the spots.

References

Stellar phenomena
Solar phenomena
Planetary geology